Saurita astyoche is a moth in the subfamily Arctiinae. It was described by Carl Geyer in 1832. It is found in Suriname and Rio Grande do Sul, Brazil.

References

Moths described in 1832
Saurita